Acritus is a genus of clown beetles in the family Histeridae. There are at least 110 described species in Acritus.

See also
 List of Acritus species

References

 Mazur, Slawomir (1997). "A world catalogue of the Histeridae (Coleoptera: Histeroidea)". Genus, International Journal of Invertebrate Taxonomy (Supplement), 373.

Further reading

 Arnett, R.H. Jr., M. C. Thomas, P. E. Skelley and J. H. Frank. (eds.). (2002). American Beetles, Volume II: Polyphaga: Scarabaeoidea through Curculionoidea. CRC Press LLC, Boca Raton, FL.
 
 Richard E. White. (1983). Peterson Field Guides: Beetles. Houghton Mifflin Company.

External links

 NCBI Taxonomy Browser, Acritus

Histeridae
Staphyliniformia genera
Taxa named by John Eatton Le Conte